Sukri river flows from the western slopes of Aravalli Range near Desuri in Pali District and flows through Guda Endla, Rani and Chanod. Its total length in the Pali district is 103 km. Another river of the same name originates from Aravali range and flows through Sojat and Gaguda, with total length of 75 km in Pali District. It feeds Bankli Dam, located in Jalore District and then merge with the Luni river near Samdari. Jalore, Pali and Barmer are covered in its sub-basin.

References

 

Rivers of Rajasthan
Jalore district
Pali district
Rivers of India